Gexa Energy, headquartered in Houston, Texas, is a retail electricity provider which sells electricity service to residential and commercial customers in all deregulated markets in Texas.

The company is a subsidiary of NextEra Energy Resources. Based in Juno Beach, Florida, NextEra Energy Resources is a subsidiary of NextEra Energy, Inc.

Overview

The Public Utility Commission of Texas approved Gexa Energy as a retail electric provider in 2001.

Gexa Energy entered the Texas deregulated electricity market in 2002.  The company services residential and commercial customers in Houston, Dallas, Fort Worth, Corpus Christi, Midland, Harlingen, Odessa, Lubbock, Waco and all Texas markets where electricity service has been deregulated. Gexa Energy was acquired by NextEra Energy, Inc. formerly FPL Group, in 2005. Gexa operates as a subsidiary of NextEra Energy Resources. NextEra markets under the NextEra Energy Services brand in Delaware, Maryland, New Hampshire, New Jersey, Pennsylvania, and the District of Columbia.

Gexa Energy has an A+ rating with the Better Business Bureau and has won the Winner of Distinction Award for Excellence 8 times in a row since 2011. Gexa was also named the winner of the 2019 Pinnacle award. In August 2019, Gexa Energy announced that all of its residential plans will be powered by 100% renewable energy at no additional cost to customers.

See also 
 Deregulation of the Texas electricity market

References

External links 
 
 Texas "Power To Choose" informational website

Companies based in Houston
Electric power companies of the United States
NextEra Energy